Sympistis aterrima is a moth of the family Noctuidae first described by Augustus Radcliffe Grote in 1879. It is found in North America, including California.

The wingspan is about 25 mm.

References

aterrima
Moths of North America
Fauna of California
Moths described in 1879